Pella is an ancient city located in Central Macedonia, Greece. It served as the capital of the ancient Greek kingdom of Macedon and was the birthplace of Alexander the Great.

Pella was probably founded at the beginning of the 4th century BC by Archelaus I as the new capital of Macedon, supplanting Aigai. The city was the birthplace of Philip II in 382 BC, and of Alexander the Great, his son, in 356 BC. Pella quickly became the largest and richest city in Macedonia and flourished particularly under the rule of Cassander and Antigonus II. In 168 BC the city was sacked by the Romans during the Third Macedonian War and entered a long period of decline, its importance eclipsed by that of the nearby Thessalonika.

Etymology
The name is probably derived from the word pella,, "stone" which seems to appear in some other toponyms in Greece like Pellene. Solders in an essay on Hesychius glossary has referenced  (pella), λίθος (stone) as an ancient Macedonian word. With the prefix "α" it forms the word , apella, "fence, enclosure of stones". Robert Beekes relates the word  with the name of the city, but suggests that it probably has pre-Greek origin.

History

In antiquity, Pella was a strategic port connected to the Thermaic Gulf by a navigable inlet, but the harbour and gulf have since silted up, leaving the site landlocked.

Pella is first mentioned by Herodotus of Halicarnassus (VII, 123) in relation to Xerxes' campaign and by Thucydides (II, 99,4 and 100,4) in relation to Macedonian expansion and the war against Sitalces, the king of the Thracians.

It was probably built as the commercial capital of the kingdom of Macedon by Archelaus I, complementing the older palace-city of Aigai although there appears to be some possibility that it may have been created by Amyntas III.

Archelaus invited the painter Zeuxis, the greatest painter of the time, to decorate his palace. He also later hosted the poet Timotheus of Miletus and the Athenian playwright Euripides who finished his days there writing and producing Archelaus. Euripides Bacchae was first staged here, about 408 BC. According to Xenophon, in the beginning of the 4th century BC Pella was the largest Macedonian city. It was the birthplace and seats of Philip II, in 382 BC and of Alexander the Great, his son, in 356 BC. It was already a walled city in the time of Philip II and he made the city of great international importance.

It became the largest and richest city in Macedonia and flourished particularly under Cassander's rule who redesigned and expanded it. The reign of Antigonus most likely represented the height of the city's prosperity, as this is the period which has left the most archaeological remains. The famous poet Aratus died in Pella c. 240 BC.

Pella is further mentioned by Polybius and Livy as the capital of Philip V and of Perseus during the Macedonian Wars fought against the Roman Republic.

In 168 BC, it was sacked by the Romans, and its treasury transported to Rome, and Livy reported how the city looked in 167 BC to Lucius Aemilius Paulus Macedonicus, the Roman who defeated Perseus at the battle of Pydna:
 ...[Paulus] observed that it was not without good reason that it had been chosen as the royal residence. It is situated on the south-west slope of a hill and surrounded by a marsh too deep to be crossed on foot either in summer or winter. The citadel the "Phacus," which is close to the city, stands in the marsh itself, projecting like an island, and is built on a huge substructure which is strong enough to carry a wall and prevent any damage from the infiltration from the water of the lagoon. At a distance it appears to be continuous with the city wall, but it is really separated by a channel which flows between the two walls and is connected with the city by a bridge. Thus it cuts off all means of access from an external foe, and if the king shut anyone up there, there could be no possibility of escape except by the bridge, which could be very easily guarded.

Pella was declared capital of the 3rd administrative division of the Roman province of Macedonia, and was possibly the seat of the Roman governor. Activity continued to be vigorous until the early 1st century BC and, crossed by the Via Egnatia, Pella remained a significant point on the route between Dyrrachium and Thessalonika.

In about 90 BC the city was destroyed by an earthquake; shops and workshops dating from the catastrophe have been found with remains of their merchandise, though the city was eventually rebuilt over its ruins. Cicero stayed there in 58 BC, though by then the provincial seat had already transferred to Thessalonika.

Pella was promoted to a Roman Colony sometime between 45 and 30 BC and its currency was marked Colonia Iulia Augusta Pella. Augustus settled peasants there whose land he had usurped to give to his veterans (Dio Cassius LI, 4). But, unlike other Macedonian colonies such as Philippi, Dion, and Cassandreia, it never came under the jurisdiction of ius Italicum or Roman law. Four pairs of colonial magistrates (duumvirs quinquennales) are known for this period.

The decline of the city was rapid, in spite of being a Colonia: Dio Chrysostom (Or. 33.27) and Lucian both attest to the ruin of the ancient capital of Philip II and Alexander, though their accounts may be exaggerated. In fact, the Roman city was somewhat to the west of and distinct from the original capital, which explains some contradictions between coinage, epigraphs, and testimonial accounts. Despite its decline, archaeology has shown that the southern part of the city near the lagoon continued to be occupied until the 4th century.

In about AD 180, Lucian of Samosata could describe it in passing as "now insignificant, with very few inhabitants". It later bore the name Diocletianopolis (Διοκλητιανούπολις - Diokletianoupolis).

In the Byzantine period, the Roman site was occupied by a fortified village.

Excavations there by the Greek Archaeological Service begun in 1957 revealed large, well-built houses with colonnaded courts and rooms with mosaic floors portraying such scenes as a lion hunt and Dionysus riding a panther. In modern times it finds itself as the starting point of the Alexander The Great Marathon, in honour of the city's ancient heritage.

Archaeology

The site was explored by 19th-century voyagers including Holand, François Pouqueville, Félix de Beaujour, Cousinéry, Delacoulonche, Hahn, Gustave Glotz and Struck, based on the descriptions provided by Titus Livius. The first excavation was begun by G. Oikonomos in 1914–15. The modern systematic exploration of the site began in 1953 and work has continued since then uncovering significant parts of the extensive city.

In February 2006, a farmer accidentally uncovered the largest tomb ever found in Greece. The names of the noble ancient Macedonian family are still on inscriptions and painted sculptures and walls have survived. The tomb dates to the 2nd or 3rd century BC.
Overall, archaeologists have uncovered 1,000 tombs at Pella since 2000, but these only represent an estimated 5% of those at the site. In 2009 43 graves containing rich and elaborate grave goods were found and in 2010 37 tombs dating from 650 to 280 BC were discovered containing rich ancient Macedonian artifacts ranging from ceramics to precious metals. One of the tombs was the final resting place of a warrior from the 6th century BC with a bronze helmet with a gold mouthplate, weapons and jewellery.

Since 2011, much of the palace has been excavated and from 2017 parts of it have been restored.

Many artefacts are displayed in the Archaeological Museum of Pella.

Hippodamian plan

The city proper was located south of and below the palace. Designed on a grid plan as envisaged by Hippodamus, it consists of parallel streets which intersect at right angles and form a grid of eight rows of rectangular blocks. The blocks are of a consistent width—each approximately 45 m—and of a length which varies from 111 m to 152 m, 125 metres being the most common. The streets are from 9 to 10 metres wide, except for the middle East–West arterial, which is up to 15 metres wide. This street is the primary access to the central public agora, which occupied a space of ten blocks. Two North-South streets are also a bit wider than the rest, and serve to connect the city to the port further South. This type of plan dates to the first half of the 4th century BC, and is very close to the ideal in design, though it distinguishes itself by large block size; Olynthus in Chalcidice for example had blocks of 86.3×35 metres. On the other hand, later Hellenistic urban foundations have blocks comparable to those of Pella: 112×58 m in Laodicea ad Mare, or 120×46 m in Aleppo.

Urban area

The city is built on the former island of Phacos, a promontory which dominated the sea to the south in the Hellenistic period. The city wall mentioned by Livy is only partly known. It consists of a rampart of crude bricks (~ 50 cm square) raised on a stone foundation; some of which has been located North of the palace, and some in the South next to the lake. Inside the ramparts, three hills occupy the North.

In pride of place in the centre of the city is the Agora, built in the last quarter of the 4th century BC and an architectural gem, unique in conception and size; it covered ~ 7 hectares or 10 city blocks. Pella is one of the first known cities to have had an extensive piped water supply to individual house and waste water disposal from most of the city.

The agora was surrounded by the shaded colonnades of stoas, and streets of enclosed houses with frescoed walls round inner courtyards. The first trompe-l'œil wall murals imitating perspective views ever seen were on walls at Pella. There were temples to Aphrodite, Cybele and Demeter. Pella's pebble-mosaic floors are famous: some reproduce Greek paintings; one shows a lion-griffin attacking a stag, a familiar motif also of Scythian art, another depicts Dionysus riding a leopard. These mosaics adorned the floors of rich houses, often named after their representations, 
particularly the Houses of Helen and Dionysus.

Palace

The palace is situated on a 70 m high hill north of the city, a strategic position commanding the entire area and occupying a vast area of 75,000 m2. It consisted of several large architectural groupings on terraces ascending from south-west to north-east, each with a series of rooms around a central courtyard, generally with porticos. The oldest parts date from the time of Philip II, 350-330 BC, and the palace was further developed over time.

The south facade of the palace, towards the city, consisted of one large (at least 153 metres long) portico, constructed on a 2 m-high foundation. The relationship between the four principal complexes is defined by an interruption in the portico occupied by a triple propylaeum, 15 m high, which gave the palace an imposing monumental air when seen from the city below.

Archaeologists have also identified a palaestra and baths dating from the reign of Cassander.

The size of the complex indicates that, unlike the palace at Vergina, this was not only a royal residence or a grandiose monument but also a place of government which was required to accommodate a significant portion of the administrative apparatus of the kingdom.

Language

The question of what language was spoken in ancient Macedonia has been debated by the scholars. The discovery of the Pella curse tablet in 1986, found in Pella, the ancient capital of Macedon, has given us a text written in a distinct Doric Greek idiom. Ιt contains a curse or magic spell (Greek: κατάδεσμος, katadesmos) inscribed on a lead scroll, dated to the first half of the 4th century BC (c. 375–350 BC). It was published in the Hellenic Dialectology Journal in 1993. It is one of four texts found until today that might represent a local dialectal form of ancient Greek in Macedonia, all of them identifiable as Doric. These confirm that a Doric Greek dialect was spoken in Macedonia, as was previously expected from the West Greek forms of names found in Macedonia. As a result, the Pella curse tablet has been forwarded as a strong argument that the Ancient Macedonian language was a dialect of North-Western Greek, part of the Doric dialects.

See also
 List of ancient Greek cities

References

Bibliography 

 
 
 
 

Despoina Papakonstantinou - Diamantourou, Πέλλα Ι, Ιστορική επισκόπησις και μαρτυρίαι, Βιβλιοθήκη τῆς ἐν Ἀθήναις Ἀρχαιολογικῆς Ἑταιρείας 70 (1971) - (Pella Ι, istoriki episkopisis kai martyriai - in Greek)
Ph. Petsas, Pella. Alexander the Great's Capital, Thessaloniki, 1977.
 F. Papazoglou, Les villes de Macédoine romaine, BCH Suppl. 16, 1988, pp135–139.
 R. Ginouvès, et al., La Macédoine, CNRS Éditions, Paris, 1993, pp90–98.
Ch. J. Makaronas, Pella: Capital of Ancient Macedonia, pp59–65, in Scientific American, Special Issue, "Ancient Cities", c 1994.

External links

Pleiades gazetteer entry for Pella/Diokletianoupolis
Princeton Encyclopedia of Classical Sites (via Perseus)
Macedonian Heritage
Greek Ministry of Culture
Local Newspaper
House of Dionysos in Pella, 3D Architectural Reconstruction

 
Populated places established in the 4th century BC
1914 archaeological discoveries
Ancient Greek archaeological sites in Central Macedonia
Former populated places in Greece
Cities in ancient Macedonia
Populated places in ancient Macedonia
Ancient Greece
Capitals of former nations